Charles John Harder (born November 9, 1969) is an American lawyer at the law firm Harder LLP based in Los Angeles, California.

Education and early career
Harder graduated from the University of California, Santa Cruz with a bachelor's degree, in 1991. He earned a juris doctor degree from Loyola Law School in Los Angeles, in 1996. After completing law school, Harder served as a law clerk to U.S. District Judge A. Andrew Hauk, in Los Angeles.

Notable cases 
Harder is best known for representing Hulk Hogan (real name Terry Bollea) in the Bollea v. Gawker case.

In 2007, Harder represented videogame publisher Ubisoft in a one-week arbitration trial, defeating an $11 million claim by a German videogame producer.

In 2009–2016, Harder represented numerous celebrities in cases over misappropriation of their names and likeness, including Sandra Bullock, George Clooney, Bradley Cooper, Jude Law, Mandy Moore, Liam Neeson, Julia Roberts and Reese Witherspoon. Harder also won four different ICANN arbitrations for Sandra Bullock, Cameron Diaz, Kate Hudson and Sigourney Weaver, respectively.

In 2011, Harder won an $18 million verdict for Cecchi Gori Pictures, and defeated a multi-million dollar counterclaim, after a four-week trial in Los Angeles state court.

In 2017–18, Harder represented Ivan Aguilera, the heir of Mexican pop icon Juan Gabriel, against Univision and Telemundo, in a $100 million defamation suit.

In 2017, Harder threatened to sue the New York Times on behalf of Harvey Weinstein, the day after the Times published the first story about him allegedly engaging in harassment. The lawsuit was never filed and Harder withdrew from the representation the next week.

In 2017, Harder represented First Lady Melania Trump in a defamation case against the Daily Mail, which resulted in a $2.9 million settlement payment to Trump, and a public retraction and apology by the Daily Mail to her. In 2018, he also represented President Donald Trump in legal demand letters sent to political consultant/media executive Steve Bannon and author Michael Wolff. Harder also represented Jared Kushner in connection with a Vanity Fair article covering the 2017 Special Counsel investigation. He represented the Trump campaign in a legal action taken against Omarosa Manigault Newman following the publication of her book, Unhinged.

In 2018, Harder represented Trump in a defamation lawsuit filed by Stormy Daniels (real name Stephanie Clifford).  On October 15, 2018, the U.S. District Court granted an anti-SLAPP motion filed by Harder, dismissing the lawsuit with prejudice and awarding Trump reimbursement of his attorneys fees against Stormy Daniels. On December 11, 2018, the court ordered Stormy Daniels to pay Trump 75% reimbursement of his attorneys fees or $292,052.33, plus a $1000 sanction on Stormy Daniels as well. "The court’s order," Harder said, "along with the court’s prior order dismissing Stormy Daniels’ defamation case against President Trump, together constitute a total victory for the President, and a total defeat for Stormy Daniels in this case." On July 31, 2020, the Ninth Circuit U.S. Court of Appeals affirmed the U.S. District Court's ruling, in a unanimous 3-0 decision.

In 2019, Harder sent a letter to CNN on behalf of Trump and his campaign claiming CNN was violating the federal Lanham Act by marketing itself as a news organization.

In 2019, Harder sued Oakley on behalf of US Olympic gold medalist Shaun White, for using his name and image beyond the term permitted by an earlier contract between them.

In 2020, Harder sued VICE Media on behalf of BYD, a multi-billion dollar electric vehicle manufacturer based in China backed by Warren Buffett.

Personal life 
Harder bicycled across the US at age 19.

References

Further reading
 
 
 
 
 
 
 

California lawyers
Loyola Law School alumni
University of California, Santa Cruz alumni
People from Encino, Los Angeles
Living people
1969 births